Attalea oleifera is a species of flowering plant in the family Arecaceae that is endemic to Brazil.

References

oleifera
Flora of Brazil
Least concern plants
Taxonomy articles created by Polbot